Louis Souchaud (born 10 September 1995) is a French footballer who most recently played as a goalkeeper for French side US Quevilly-Rouen.

Career
Souchaud is a youth exponent from LB Châteauroux. He made his Ligue 2 debut on 27 February 2015 against Nîmes Olympique in a 2–1 home win.

After not featuring in the 2017–18 Ligue 2 season, Souchaud left Châteauroux and signed for US Quevilly-Rouen in Championnat National. He went on to play for the club for two seasons, but at the end of the 2019–20 season, his contract was not renewed.

Career statistics
.

References

External links
 

1995 births
Living people
People from Le Blanc
French footballers
Association football goalkeepers
LB Châteauroux players
US Quevilly-Rouen Métropole players
Ligue 2 players
Championnat National players
Sportspeople from Indre
Footballers from Centre-Val de Loire